The 2017–18 Louisiana Ragin' Cajuns women's basketball team represents the University of Louisiana at Lafayette during the 2017–18 NCAA Division I women's basketball season. The Ragin' Cajuns are led by sixth-year head coach Garry Brodhead and play their double-header home games at the Cajundome with the men and single games at the Earl K. Long Gymnasium, which is located on the University of Louisiana at Lafayette campus. They were members in the Sun Belt Conference. They finished the season 17–16, 10–8 in Sun Belt play to finish in a 3-way tie for sixth place. They advanced to the semifinals of the Sun Belt women's tournament where they lost to Texas State.

Previous season 
The Ragin' Cajuns finished the 2016–17 season 20–11, 11–7 in Sun Belt play to finish fourth in the conference. They made it to the 2016-17 Sun Belt Conference Women's Basketball championship game after defeating Louisiana-Monroe, Texas State, and Little Rock in the First Round, Quarterfinals, and the Semifinals, respectively. They lost in heartbreaking fashion against Troy in the championship by the score of 64–78. The Ragin' Cajuns did not participate in post-season play.

Offseason

Departures

Incoming recruits

Roster

Schedule and results

|-
!colspan=9 style=| Exhibition

|-
!colspan=9 style=| Non-conference regular season

|-
!colspan=9 style=| Sun Belt regular season

|-
!colspan=9 style=| Sun Belt Women's Tournament

See also
 2017–18 Louisiana Ragin' Cajuns men's basketball team

References

Louisiana Ragin' Cajuns women's basketball seasons
Louisiana Ragin' Cajuns